The Independent Party of Delaware (IPoD) is a political party in the State of Delaware, United States. As of March 2021, it is the third largest political party in Delaware with 9,443 registered voters. The preamble outlines the party's goals: "The Independent Party of Delaware is dedicated to reform of government at all levels in the Greater Public Interest through election of independent alternative candidates". The party supports laissez-faire capitalism, limited government, and environmentalism. It was officially formed on August 29, 2000, for the stated purpose of providing Delaware voters with an alternative to the Republican and Democratic parties. The party works to support independent candidates for public office by providing them with ballot access, distributing information to voters, and encouraging participation in candidate debates.

History 
The Independent Party of Delaware was founded on August 29, 2000, by Floyd McDowell and Frank Sims. In 2000, the party ran Floyd McDowell Sr. for governor and he received 3,271 votes, or 1.1% of the total vote. In 2002 Maurice Barros, running for U.S. Senate, received 996 votes, for 0.4% of the total vote. In 2004, the party, along with the Libertarian Party, nominated Frank Infante for governor. Infante received 10,753 votes on the Independent Party line (2.9% of vote), and 1,450 votes (0.4%) on the Libertarian Party ballot line. In 2006, Karen M. Hartley-Nagle, running for Delaware's Senate seat, received 5,769 votes for 2.2% of the total vote. In 2004, the party gave its ballot line to the independent presidential campaign of Ralph Nader; he received 2,152 votes for 0.6% of the total vote in Delaware. In 2008, the party again gave its ballot line to the independent presidential campaign of Ralph Nader; he received 2,401 votes. In 2012, the party ran Alex Pires for the US Senate. He received 15,300 votes, or 3.8%. The party also ran 4 candidates for the state legislature. One candidate for State Senate, running in a district with no major party opposition, received 20.1% of the vote. In 2014, the party ran David Graham for attorney general of Delaware against Matthew P. Denn, Ted Kittila, Catherine Damavandi and John Machurek and he received 4,879 for 2.1% of the vote. In 2016, the party endorsed Republican Party presidential nominee Donald Trump for president.

Gubernatorial Election Results

Attorney General Election Results

Senate Election Results

US Representative Election Results

See also 

 Third party (United States)
 Delaware gubernatorial election, 2000
 Delaware gubernatorial election, 2004
 Delaware elections, 2014

References

External links
 Independent Party of Delaware official Party website

Politics of Delaware
Political parties in Delaware
Environmental organizations based in the United States
Classical liberal parties in the United States
Political parties established in 2000
2000 establishments in Delaware
Political parties in the United States